Alexander Russell (18 January 1923 – 24 February 2014) was a Northern Irish footballer who played as a goalkeeper.

Career
Russell made over 600 appearances for Linfield, winning 39 medals.

He earned one cap for Northern Ireland in 1946.

Personal life
Russell was born on 18 January 1923 in Kells, County Antrim. He is the uncle of footballer Jackie Fullerton, who later worked as reporter and football commentator for BBC Northern Ireland. Russell died on 24 February 2014 in Antrim at the age of 91.

References

External links

1923 births
2014 deaths
Sportspeople from County Antrim
Association footballers from Northern Ireland
Pre-1950 IFA international footballers
Cliftonville F.C. players
Linfield F.C. players
Association football goalkeepers
Irish League representative players
NIFL Premiership players